Khalil-ur-Rehman or Khalilur Rahman is a male Muslim given name, meaning friend of the Most Gracious. Notable bearers of the name include:

Khalil-ur-Rehman
Khalil-ur-Rehman (politician) (born 1988), Pakistani politician
Khalil-ur-Rehman Ramday (born 1945), Pakistani judge
Khalil-ur-Rehman Qamar (born 1956), Pakistani television playwright
Mir Khalil ur Rehman (1927–1992), Pakistani newspaper editor
Syed Khalil-ur-Rehman (1904–1972), Pakistani defence chief

Khalil ur Rahman
Khalil ur Rahman (politician) (1936–2011), Indian politician from Hyderabad

Khaleel-ur-Rehman
Khaleel-Ur-Rehman Azmi (1927–1978), Indian Urdu poet and literary critic

Khalilur Rehman
Khalilur Rehman (governor)  (born 1934), Commander in the Pakistan Navy and governor of province

Khalilur Rahman
Khalilur Rahman (general), Bangladeshi army general
Khalilur Rahman Chowdhury, Indian politician from Assam
Khalilur Rahaman (Bengali), Indian politician from West Bengal

Arabic masculine given names